Kings Highway is an interstate highway located within the Australian Capital Territory and New South Wales, Australia. The highway connects Canberra with Batemans Bay on the South Coast. It is designated route B52.

Route
West to east, it starts at the interchange with Monaro Highway, Canberra Avenue and Ipswich Street on the northern border of Symonston in the Australian Capital Territory and continues in a westerly direction along Canberra Avenue, crosses over the border into New South Wales near Queanbeyan, passes through Queanbeyan itself, Carwoola, briefly crosses back into the Kowen district of ACT and then back into NSW heading south-east to Batemans Bay via Bungendore, Braidwood and Nelligen.

Kings Highway links Monaro Highway in Canberra to Princes Highway in Batemans Bay, and provides access for residents of Canberra to the NSW South Coast and its beaches. The highway is often busy on weekends, especially during summer. The highway also experiences a high number of car crashes, on occasions averaging around one every three days, costing the local community around the highway several million dollars a year.

The landscape is generally sheep country. The highway travels from the Southern Tablelands to the South Coast via Clyde Mountain.

Notable features and landmarks 
A small rock cave at "Pooh Bear's Corner" can be found near the top of the Clyde Mountain Pass. This was the location of a munitions store during the Second World War, that could be detonated to stop passage from the coast to the national capital inland.

Dozens of soft toys are placed in the eucalyptus trees along the stretch of road that connects Queanbeyan and Bungendore.

History
The road through the Clyde Mountain area was surveyed by Thomas Mitchell in 1855.

A punt service across the Clyde River began at Nelligen in 1895 linking Batemans Bay to Braidwood. The service continued until 1964 when the Nelligen bridge was completed. The new Nelligen Bridge is expected to open to traffic by late 2023 and the entire project, which includes intersection upgrades and demolition of the existing bridge, is scheduled for completion by late 2024.

The passing of the Main Roads Act of 1924 through the Parliament of New South Wales provided for the declaration of Main Roads, roads partially funded by the State government through the Main Roads Board (later the Department of Main Roads, and eventually Transport for NSW). Main Road No. 51 was declared along this road on 8 August 1928, from the intersection with Princes Highway at Batemans Bay, via Braidwood, Bungendore, and Queanbeyan to the border with the Federal Capital Territory (today the Australian Capital Territory); with the passing of the Main Roads (Amendment) Act of 1929 to provide for additional declarations of State Highways and Trunk Roads, this was amended to Trunk Road 51 on 8 April 1929.

The passing of the Roads Act of 1993 through the Parliament of New South Wales updated road classifications and the way they could be declared within New South Wales. Under this act, the highway today retains its declaration as Main Road 51, from the state border with Australian Capital Territory west of Queanbeyan to the intersection with Princes Highway in Batemans Bay. Despite its long-standing classification as a Main Road, and a long historical identity as Kings Highway, the road still has no officially gazetted name. Transport for NSW has come to an informal agreement with councils along the route to signpost the entire route as Kings Highway.

Kings Highway was signed National Route 52 across its entire length in 1974. With the conversion to the newer alphanumeric system in both states in 2013, this was replaced with route B52.

In 2006 construction commenced on Headquarters Joint Operations Command in the Kowen district of the ACT between Bungendore and Queanbeyan. The facility opened in December 2008, and sections of the highway between the HQJOC turnoff and Queanbeyan have progressively been upgraded to cater for the increased traffic.

Road usage 
In 2013 it was reported that the highway carries an average of 4,500 vehicles a day. There is an increase in traffic in the summer months. In 2003, approximately 3,000 vehicles a day were using the highway at Nelligen. From Braidwood (at the Shoalhaven River Bridge) there were about 4,200 cars travelling on the road. Out of Bungendore near Burbong, 5,600 cars were counted each day.

Casualty crash rates on the Kings Highway are 85% higher than the NSW average and road fatalities are 8% higher. A 2005 NRMA Motoring and Services road survey found:
 The rate of people hospitalised after crashes on the Kings Highway is well over the national average. 877 crashes were recorded on Kings Highway over a 10-year period, an average of about one crash every four days. Over this time there have been 24 fatal crashes, 355 crashes resulting in injury and 488 crashes resulting in property damage. The rate was worse than this in 2004, when there were 103 crashes resulting in six fatalities and 53 injuries.
 Crashes on the Kings Highway have cost A$42.65 million over the past three years – that's equivalent to nearly A$39,000 every day.
 Safety: particular concerns over Clyde Mountain, and only 5% of road deemed to provide "safe" overtaking opportunities. Two blackspots (one in Eurobodalla and one in Palerang) and 16 blacklengths (nine in Eurobodalla, six in Palerang and one in Queanbeyan City) were identified. The  section of road over the Great Dividing Range – which includes Clyde Mountain – recorded the highest number of crashes, with 22% of all incidents occurring in this area.
 The most common type of crash – 18% of all incidents – was when a vehicle leaves the road to the left on a right hand bend and crashes into a stationary object. Head-on collisions made up one in 10 of all crashes. Crashes occurred most frequently on Sundays (20%) and least frequently on Tuesdays (9%). Recent drought conditions and an explosion in the kangaroo population in the area, has seen a marked increase in the number of crashes between vehicles and these macropods – particularly at night. This is evidenced by the increasing levels of 'road kill' carcasses on the sides of the Highway.

Major intersections

Gallery

See also

 Highways in Australia
 List of highways in New South Wales

References 

Highways in New South Wales
Highways in the Australian Capital Territory
Southern Tablelands